The following are considered holidays in Taiwan.  Some are official holidays, and some are not:

Table of Taiwan holidays

Public holidays

Unofficial holidays

The following holidays are also observed on Taiwan but are not official holidays observed by civil servants of the central government. Some sectors of the workforce may have time off on some of the following holidays, such as Labor Day, Armed Forces Day, and Teachers' Day.

Before 1949, a number of public holidays were celebrated by certain ethnic minorities in regions within the ROC, which were decided by local governments and entities. Since 1949, these holidays continued to be celebrated by ethnic groups as such in Taiwan Area only.

See also
 Traditional Chinese holidays
 Public holidays in China

References

External links
 Holidays and Festivals in Taiwan
 Official Work Calendar in Taiwan by the Directorate-General of Personnel Administration (DGPA)

 
Taiwan
Observances in Taiwan
Holidays